Lucio Lombardo-Radice (Catania, 10 July 1916; Brussels, 21 November 1982) was an Italian mathematician. A student of Gaetano Scorza, Lombardo-Radice contributed to finite geometry and geometric combinatorics together with Guido Zappa and Beniamino Segre, and wrote important works concerning the Non-Desarguesian plane. He was also a leading member of the Italian Communist Party and a member of its central committee.

Lombardo-Radice's parents were Giuseppe Lombardo Radice and Gemma Harasim. His children included the writer  and actor Giovanni Lombardo Radice.

The Istituto Tecnico Statale Commerciale "Lucio Lombardo Radice" per Programmatori, a school in Rome, Italy, founded in 1982 as the XXV Istituto Tecnico Commerciale per Programmatori, was in 1992 renamed after Lombardo-Radice. It is now named Istituto di Istruzione Superiore Lombardo Radice

References

External links 

1916 births
1982 deaths
20th-century Italian mathematicians
Italian communists
Combinatorialists
People from Catania
Mathematicians from Sicily